Borilović is a Montenegrin surname, a patronymic derived from the Slavic given name Boril. It may refer to:

Gradislav Borilović (14th century), kaznac and vojvoda
Vučko Borilović (1988–2022), perpetrator of the 2022 Cetinje shooting

See also
Borilovići, settlement

Serbian surnames